The Bears–Vikings rivalry is an NFL rivalry between the Chicago Bears and Minnesota Vikings.

It began when the Vikings entered the league as an expansion team in 1961. The first time these two teams met, the Vikings stunned the Bears 37–13 in Minnesota. Both teams are members of the NFC North, and play at least twice a year. The rivalry is known for having had many offensive-oriented contests, and also several surprising results. The Vikings lead the overall series 65–57–2. The teams have met once in the postseason, a 35–18 Bears win in the 1994 Wild Card Round.

Notable moments
The first meeting between the two teams occurred on September 17, 1961. The upstart Vikings upset the dominant Bears 37–13 in the Vikings' first game as a franchise.
On October 27, 1968, with :03 left in the game, the Vikings led the Bears 24–23 at Wrigley Field. Bears kicker Mac Percival booted a 47-yard game-winning field goal to give the Bears the 26–24 win.
On November 28, 1982, the Bears visited the Vikings for their first meeting in the Metrodome. Vikings quarterback Tommy Kramer threw for five touchdown passes, and the Vikings dominated the Bears 35–7.
In their 1985 Super Bowl run, the Bears met the Vikings in Minnesota for a Thursday Night game on September 19, 1985. The Bears, struggling on offense, trailed 17–9 at the start of the third quarter. Bears' quarterback Jim McMahon convinced coach Mike Ditka to let him play and stepped in the game, having had back spasms prior to the game. On his first throw, McMahon launched a 70-yard touchdown pass, threw a 25-yard touchdown pass on the first play of the next Bears possession to take the lead, and led the Bears to score a third touchdown on the next series. The Bears ended up winning the game 33–24, in a game sometimes called 'The Viking Miracle'. Later in the season, the Bears again beat the Vikings in Chicago, 27–9.
On October 4, 1992, the Mike Ditka-coached Bears visited Minneapolis and dominated the Vikings for three quarters. Leading 20–0 with the ball in the fourth quarter, Bears quarterback Jim Harbaugh audibled out of a run play and threw an ill-advised pass that was intercepted by Vikings defensive back Todd Scott and returned for a 35-yard touchdown. Afterward, Ditka was seen on the sidelines screaming at Harbaugh over the mistake, which the Vikings used as an emotional springboard for two more fourth-quarter touchdowns – a total of 21 unanswered fourth-quarter points and a 21–20 victory for Minnesota. The Bears, who were 2–2 prior to this game, finished with a 5–11 record and Ditka was fired as Bears coach following the season.
On January 1, 1995, the Bears met the Vikings in the Metrodome for their first playoff game and, as of 2020, only time in their history together. Despite being swept in the regular season by the Vikings (including a 33–27 overtime Vikings win in Week Fourteen), the Bears beat the Vikings 35–18 in the game.
On October 14, 2007, the Bears hosted the Vikings at Soldier Field. The game was scoreless until Devin Hester returned a punt for an 89-yard touchdown with two minutes left in the first quarter. On the final play of the first quarter, Vikings quarterback Tarvaris Jackson threw a 60-yard touchdown pass to Troy Williamson. Bears quarterback Brian Griese threw for 373 yards and three touchdowns and two interceptions, while the Vikings, behind rookie running back Adrian Peterson's 224 rushing yards and three scores, gained 311 rushing yards. The Vikings had a 31–17 lead with five minutes to go in regulation, but two Griese touchdowns tied the game with 1:38 left in the game. The Vikings' Ryan Longwell kicked a 55-yard field goal on the final play for a 34–31 Vikings win.
The highest scoring match-up in the two clubs' history came on October 19, 2008, at Soldier Field. The Bears won 48–41 as Kyle Orton threw for 283 yards and two touchdowns, while the Vikings' Gus Frerotte had 298 passing yards and two touchdowns but threw four interceptions, the last coming in the final two minutes. The Bears scored twice off botched Vikings punts; Garrett Wolfe ran in a 17-yard score off a blocked punt in the first quarter, while in the second the Vikings dropped a punt snap and Zackary Bowman fell on it in the endzone for a Bears touchdown.
En route to the 2008 division title, the Vikings on November 30, 2008, hosted the Bears, and broke out of a close contest with a 99-yard touchdown catch by Vikings former Bear Bernard Berrian in the second quarter. The Vikings won 34–14 as Gus Frerotte threw for 201 yards and Adrian Peterson rushed for 131.
The 11–3 Vikings traveled to Soldier Field on December 28, 2009, for a Monday Night Football match-up with the 5–9 Bears. The Bears manhandled the Vikings in the game's first half, forcing a Brett Favre fumble and scoring on three Robbie Gould field goals and a seven-yard Jay Cutler touchdown to Greg Olsen. Adrian Peterson rushed in a six-yard touchdown in the third but the extra point was no good, and another Cutler touchdown (to Desmond Clark) put the score at 23–6 entering the fourth. Favre had never won a game (in 42 previous tries) in which his team trailed by at least 17 points, but Favre connected with Visanthe Shiancoe in the third, then after a Ryan Longwell field goal Peterson ran in a second touchdown for a 23–23 tie. The Bears clawed downfield and Cutler found Earl Bennett in the endzone, then Favre, on fourth and goal, hit Sidney Rice in the final thirty seconds to tie the game at 30. Gould missed a field goal in overtime, but Peterson caught a Favre pass and then fumbled to the Bears at Minnesota's 39-yard line. Cutler then found Devin Aromashodu for a deep touchdown, ending the game in a wild 36–30 Bears win.
The scheduled December 20, 2010 meeting at the Metrodome was moved to TCF Bank Stadium after a snowstorm punctured the inflatable roof and caused a collapse. The Bears clinched the NFC North title by beating the Vikings 40–14. Devin Hester broke a tie with Brian Mitchell for most return touchdowns by scoring on a 66-yard punt, the league-record 14th of his career, while Jay Cutler threw for 194 yards and three touchdowns. Brett Favre, initially ruled out of the game, suited up and started, but after a touchdown in the first quarter he was sacked and thrown head-first to the ground; he left the game and did not return, and never played in the NFL again.
On September 15, 2013, the Bears and Vikings met each other in Week 2 of the 2013 season for a division match-up, the first under new Bears head coach Marc Trestman. Viking Cordarrelle Patterson returned the opening kickoff 105 yards for a touchdown. Bears' quarterback Jay Cutler followed it up with two touchdown passes (to Martellus Bennett and Brandon Marshall) to take a 14–7 lead. A Cutler fumble was returned by Brian Robison 61 yards for a Vikings touchdown. Tim Jennings of the Bears intercepted Vikings' quarterback Christian Ponder for 44 yards to take the lead. Ponder was able to throw a touchdown to tie the game. Robbie Gould kicked a 20-yard field goal for a 24–21 Bears lead at halftime. In the second half, Blair Walsh kicked three field goals for the Vikings, putting them ahead 30–24. With just 10 seconds left in the game, Jay Cutler threw the game-winning touchdown to Martellus Bennett to win 31–30. The win improved the Bears' record to 2–0 while it dropped the Vikings to 0–2.
On December 1, 2013, the Bears and the Vikings played in a rematch which turned into an overtime thriller. The Bears were missing Cutler due to an injury (Josh McCown played in his place), and Ponder was injured early in game, making way for backup Matt Cassel. McCown played well, leading his team to a 20–10 lead with two TD passes to Alshon Jeffery. However, Cassel and his team responded to that deficit with a reception by Greg Jennings and tied the game with a Blair Walsh field goal with little time to retaliate in the fourth. The Bears tried an improbable 66-yard field goal just following a Devin Hester run which set it up. The kick fell short and land in the hands of Patterson, who tried to make a run of his own which did not go far, and the game went into overtime. Walsh successfully kicked a 39-yard field goal for the Vikings, but his score was negated after a facemask penalty, and he missed a 57-yard field goal thereafter. The Bears tried a 47-yard field goal on second down to win the game quickly, but the ball sailed too far to the right, ending their drive. Once the Vikings got the ball back, they set up a 34-yard field goal for Walsh, which ended up winning the game for the Vikings.
On December 30, 2018, the 11–4 Bears met the 8–6–1 Vikings at U.S. Bank Stadium in a game with playoff implications. If the Bears won and the Rams lost, the Bears would get the second seed and a first-round bye by virtue of head-to-head tiebreaker. If the Vikings won, they would be in the playoffs as the sixth seed and earn the final playoff spot over the Eagles also by virtue of head-to-head tiebreaker. The Bears won 24–10 with 109 rushing yards and two touchdowns from running back Jordan Howard, eliminating the Vikings and allowing the Eagles to clinch the sixth seed following their win. However, because the Rams won their game, the Bears did not get a first-round bye and ended up losing to the Eagles in the wild-card round. Had the Vikings won, the two teams would have met in the Wild Card round at Soldier Field.
On October 9, 2022, the Vikings lead the Bears 21–3 late in the second quarter. The Bears scored a touchdown with 1:08 left in the second quarter that made it 21–10 by halftime. The Bears though rallied back scoring 19 unanswered points and took a 22–21 lead with 9:31 left in the game. The Vikings however on their next drive drove down the field from their own 25-yard line and scored a touchdown and made a two-point conversion with 2:26 left in the game to lead 29–22. The Bears, however, still had a chance to potentially tie the game and send it to overtime. The Bears started on their own 25 and were able to drive down to their own 46 with 1:14 left in the game. On their 5th play of the drive, Bears quarterback Justin Fields completed a pass to wide receiver and former Viking, Ihmir Smith-Marsette for 15 yards. Marsette tried to get more yards but the ball in his hands was stripped and stolen by Vikings corner Cameron Dantzler. The Vikings ran out the clock and won 29–22.

Game results

|-
| 
| Tie 1–1
| style="| Bears  52–35 
| style="| Vikings  37–13
| Tie  1–1
| Vikings join NFL as an expansion team. Vikings defeat Bears in their first game as a franchise.
|-
| 
| style="| 
| style="| Bears  31–30 
| style="| Bears  13–0
| Bears  3–1
| 
|-
| 
| style="| 
| Tie  17–17 
| style="| Bears  28–7
| Bears  4–1–1
|
|-
| 
| Tie 1–1
| style="| Vikings  41–14
| style="| Bears  28–7
| Bears  5–2–1 
| 
|-
| 
| Tie 1–1
| style="| Vikings  24–17
| style="| Bears  45–37
| Bears  6–3–1 
| 
|-
| 
| style="| 
| style="| Bears  41–28 
| style="| Bears  13–10
| Bears  8–3–1
| 
|-
| 
| style="| 
| Tie  10–10 
| style="| Bears  16–7
| Bears  9–3–2 
| 
|-
| 
| style="| 
| style="| Bears  26–24 
| style="| Bears  27–17
| Bears  11–3–2
| Bears win 7 straight meetings in Bloomington
|-
| 
| style="| 
| style="| Vikings  31–0
| style="| Vikings  31–14
| Bears  11–5–2
| Vikings win 1969 NFL Championship, lose Super Bowl IV
|-

|-
| 
| style="| 
| style="| Vikings  24–0
| style="| Vikings  16–13
| Bears  11–7–2 
| Both teams placed in the NFC Central after AFL-NFL merger
|-
| 
| Tie 1–1
| style="| Vikings  27–10
| style="| Bears  20–17
| Bears  12–8–2 
| Bears open Soldier Field
|-
| 
| Tie 1–1
| style="| Bears  13–10
| style="| Vikings  23–10
| Bears  13–9–2 
| 
|-
| 
| style="| 
| style="| Vikings  22–13
| style="| Vikings  31–13
| Bears  13–11–2
| Vikings lose Super Bowl VIII
|-
| 
| style="| 
| style="| Vikings  17–0
| style="| Vikings  11–7
| Tie  13–13–2
| Vikings lose Super Bowl IX
|-
| 
| style="| 
| style="| Vikings  13–9
| style="| Vikings  28–3
| Vikings  15–13–2
| Vikings take first series advantage head-to-head since their first ever meeting, and have yet to relinquish it since.
|-
| 
| Tie 1–1
| style="| Bears  14–13
| style="| Vikings  20–19
| Vikings  16–14–2
| Vikings win 8 straight meetings (1972–76). Vikings lose Super Bowl XI
|-
| 
| Tie 1–1
| style="| Bears  10–7
| style="| Vikings  22–16
| Vikings  17–15–2
| 
|-
| 
| style="| 
| style="| Vikings  24–20
| style="| Vikings  17–14
| Vikings  19–15–2 
| 
|-
| 
| Tie 1–1
| style="| Bears  26–7
| style="| Vikings  30–27
| Vikings  20–16–2
| 
|-

|-
| 
| style="| 
| style="| Vikings  34–14
| style="| Vikings  13–7
| Vikings  22–16–2 
| 
|-
| 
| Tie 1–1
| style="| Bears  10–9
| style="| Vikings  24–21
| Vikings  23–17–2
|
|-
| 
| style="| 
| no game
| style="| Vikings  35–7 
| Vikings  24–17–2 
| Game in Chicago cancelled due to players strike reducing the season to 9 games. Vikings move to Hubert H. Humphrey Metrodome. Vikings win 11 straight home meetings (1972–82).
|-
| 
| Tie 1–1
| style="| Vikings  23–14
| style="| Bears  19–13
| Vikings  25–18–2
| 
|-
| 
| style="| 
| style="| Bears  16–7 
| style="| Bears  34–3
| Vikings  25–20–2
| Bears' first season sweep since 1968
|-
| 
| style="| 
| style="| Bears  27–9 
| style="| Bears  33–24
| Vikings  25–22–2
| Bears win Super Bowl XX
|-
| 
| Tie 1–1
| style="| Bears  23–0
| style="| Vikings  23–7
| Vikings  26–23–2 
| 
|-
| 
| style="| 
| style="| Bears  27–7 
| style="| Bears  30–24
| Vikings  26–25–2 
| 
|-
| 
| style="| 
| style="| Vikings  31–7
| style="| Vikings  28–27
| Vikings  28–25–2
| 
|-
| 
| Tie 1–1
| style="| Bears  38–7
| style="| Vikings  27–16
| Vikings  29–26–2
| 
|-

|-
| 
| Tie 1–1
| style="| Bears  19–16
| style="| Vikings  41–13
| Vikings  30–27–2
| 
|-
| 
| style="| 
| style="| Bears  10–6 
| style="| Bears  34–17
| Vikings  30–29–2
| 
|-
| 
| style="| 
| style="| Vikings  38–10
| style="| Vikings  21–20
| Vikings  32–29–2
| Vikings score 21 fourth quarter points to overcome 20–0 deficit in the game in Minneapolis.
|-
| 
| style="| 
| style="| Vikings  19–12
| style="| Vikings  10–7
| Vikings  34–29–2
|
|-
| 
| style="| 
| style="| Vikings  42–14
| style="| Vikings  33–27
| Vikings  36–29–2
| 
|- style="background:#f2f2f2;font-weight:bold"
| 1994 Playoffs
| style="| 
| 
| style="| Bears  35–18
| Vikings  36–30–2
| NFC Wild Card Round. Only postseason meeting between the two teams.
|-
| 
| style="| 
| style="| Bears  34–14 
| style="| Bears  14–6
| Vikings  36–32–2
| 
|-
| 
| Tie 1–1
| style="| Vikings  20–14 
| style="| Bears  15–13 
| Vikings  37–33–2
| 
|-
| 
| style="| 
| style="| Vikings  27–24
| style="| Vikings  29–22
| Vikings  39–33–2
| 
|-
| 
| style="| 
| style="| Vikings  31–28
| style="| Vikings  48–22
| Vikings  41–33–2 
| 
|-
| 
| Tie 1–1
| style="| Vikings  27–24 
| style="| Bears  24–22 
| Vikings  42–34–2
| 
|-

|-
| 
| style="| 
| style="| Vikings  28–16
| style="| Vikings  30–27
| Vikings  44–34–2
| 
|-
| 
| style="| 
| style="| Bears  17–10 
| style="| Bears  13–6
| Vikings  44–36–2
| 
|-
| 
| Tie 1–1
| style="| Bears  27–23 
| style="| Vikings  25–7 
| Vikings  45–37–2
| Bears home game played at Memorial Stadium at the University of Illinois as Soldier Field was undergoing renovations.
|-
| 
| Tie 1–1
| style="| Bears  13–10 
| style="| Vikings  24–13 
| Vikings  46–38–2
| 
|-
| 
| Tie 1–1
| style="| Bears  24–14 
| style="| Vikings  27–22 
| Vikings  47–39–2 
| 
|- 
| 
| Tie 1–1
| style="| Bears  24–3 
| style="| Vikings  38–10 
| Vikings  48–40–2 
| Home team wins 8 straight meetings (2002–05)
|-
| 
| style="| 
| style="| Bears  23–13 
| style="| Bears  19–16
| Vikings  48–42–2
| Bears lose Super Bowl XLI
|-
| 
| style="| 
| style="| Vikings  34–31
| style="| Vikings  20–13
| Vikings  50–42–2
| 
|-
| 
| Tie 1–1
| style="| Bears  48–41
| style="| Vikings  34–14 
| Vikings  51–43–2
| Bears' 48–41 win is the highest scoring game in the series and the 20th highest scoring game in NFL history (89 points)
|-
| 
| Tie 1–1
| style="| Bears  36–30(OT)
| style="| Vikings  36–10 
| Vikings  52–44–2
| 
|-

|-
| 
| style="| 
| style="| Bears  27–13 
| style="| Bears  40–14
| Vikings  52–46–2
| Game in Minneapolis moved to TCF Bank Stadium at the University of Minnesota due to damage to the Metrodome's roof
|-
| 
| style="| 
| style="| Bears  39–10 
| style="| Bears  17–13
| Vikings  52–48–2
| 
|-
| 
| Tie 1–1
| style="| Bears  28–10
| style="| Vikings  21–14 
| Vikings  53–49–2
| 
|-
| 
| Tie 1–1
| style="| Bears  31–30
| style="| Vikings  23–20(OT) 
| Vikings  54–50–2
|
|-
| 
| Tie 1–1
| style="| Bears  21–13
| style="| Vikings  13–9 
| Vikings  55–51–2
| Vikings move to TCF Bank Stadium. Bears win seven straight home meetings (2008–14)
|-
| 
| style="| 
| style="| Vikings  23–20
| style="| Vikings  38–17
| Vikings  57–51–2
| 
|-
| 
| Tie 1–1
| style="| Bears  20–10
| style="| Vikings  38–10 
| Vikings  58–52–2 
| Vikings open U.S. Bank Stadium.
|-
| 
| style="| 
| style="| Vikings  20–17
| style="| Vikings  23–10
| Vikings  60–52–2 
| 
|-
| 
| style="| 
| style="| Bears  25–20 
| style="| Bears  24–10
| Vikings  60–54–2
| Bears eliminate Vikings from playoff contention with a win in Week 17 in Minneapolis which coincided with an Eagles win.
|-
| 
| style="| 
| style="| Bears  16–6 
| style="| Bears  21–19 
| Vikings  60–56–2
|

|-
| 
| Tie 1–1
| style="| Vikings  19–13 
| style="| Bears  33–27 
| Vikings  61–57–2
| Game at Chicago was Vikings quarterback Kirk Cousins' first-ever Monday Night Football victory.
|-
| 
| style="| 
| style="| Vikings  17–9
| style="| Vikings  31–17
| Vikings  63–57–2
| Bears and Vikings fired their head coaches, Matt Nagy and Mike Zimmer, following Week 18 meeting in Minneapolis.
|-
| 
| style="| 
| style="| Vikings  29–13
| style="| Vikings  29–22
| Vikings  65–57–2
| Vikings' Week 18 win in Chicago secured the first overall pick for the Bears in the 2023 NFL Draft
|- 

|-
| Regular season
| style="|
| 
| 
| 
|-
| Postseason
| style="|
| no games
| Bears 1–0
| 1994 NFC Wild Card Round
|-
| Regular and postseason 
| style="|
| 
| 
| 
|-

Players that played for both teams

See also
Other rivalries involving teams from these regions
 Twins–White Sox rivalry
 Blackhawks–Wild rivalry

Other rivalries involving the two teams
 Bears–Cardinals rivalry
 Bears–Giants rivalry
 Bears–Lions rivalry
 Bears–Packers rivalry
 Cowboys–Vikings rivalry
 Lions–Vikings rivalry
 Packers–Vikings rivalry
 Saints–Vikings rivalry
 Rams–Vikings rivalry

References

Chicago Bears
Minnesota Vikings
National Football League rivalries
Minnesota Vikings rivalries
Chicago Bears rivalries